Sydney Brooks (born 19 July 1907) was an English professional footballer. An inside left, he played for two Football League clubs during the 1920s and 1930s.

Career
Ashby-de-la-Zouch-born Brookes began his career with Scunthorpe & Lindsey United, before turning professional with Blackpool in 1927. He made 26 League appearances and scored four goals in his four seasons with the club.

In 1932 he joined Swindon Town, making 33 appearances and scoring seven goals, before finishing his career at Scarborough.

References
Specific

General

1907 births
Date of death missing
People from Ashby-de-la-Zouch
Footballers from Leicestershire
English footballers
Scunthorpe United F.C. players
Blackpool F.C. players
Swindon Town F.C. players
Scarborough F.C. players
Year of death missing
Association football inside forwards